Evan Washburn is an American reporter for CBS Sports. He joined CBS in 2014, and is a part of the network's coverage of the NFL and NCAA basketball, along with contributing to CBS Sports Network. He is also the sideline reporter for the local TV broadcasts of the Baltimore Ravens pre-season games.

Personal life
Washburn married Kate in 2014 and they had their first child, a boy, Hudson, in 2016.

References

Year of birth uncertain
1984 births
Living people
American sports journalists
American television sports announcers
College basketball announcers in the United States
Delaware Fightin' Blue Hens men's lacrosse players
Lacrosse announcers
College football announcers
National Football League announcers
Sportspeople from Annapolis, Maryland
University of Delaware alumni
Major League Lacrosse announcers